Wanted: Ted or Alive is a reality television series that can be seen on the Versus channel, which used to be OLN. Ted Nugent invited 5 strangers to his ranch in Michigan, where he teaches them survival skills, and then they compete for cash prizes.

American reality television series